The Metaphysical Society of America (MSA) is a philosophical organization founded by Paul Weiss in 1950. As stated in its constitution, "The purpose of the Metaphysical Society of America is the study of reality." The society is a member of the American Council of Learned Societies.

Early history and purpose
In his opening address, "The Four-Fold Art of Avoiding Questions", Paul Weiss spoke of the need for a society that would reinvigorate philosophic inquiry.  He denounced "parochialism," referring to those who insisted upon "some one method, say that of pragmatism, instrumentalism, idealism, analysis, linguistics or logistics, and denied the importance of meaningfulness of anything which lies beyond its scope or power," as well as those who confined their studies to only some historic era.

Early in the history of the society, there was some dispute about whether certain schools of thought should be included in the program.  By the second meeting there was controversy regarding papers by logicians, a controversy possibly fueled by the dominance of positivism in that decade.  Before 1960, there had been some fear of admitting the existential metaphysics.  However, as Paul Weiss remarked in 1969, the society had succeeded in accomplishing metaphysical diversity: 

A book on the history of the society, Being in America: Sixty Years of the Metaphysical Society, was published by Rodopi in 2014 in its Histories and Addresses of Philosophical Societies Series.

Presidents and addresses
Since the founding of the Metaphysical Society, presidential addresses have been published in the Review of Metaphysics, which was also founded by Paul Weiss.

References

External links 
 
Metaphysical Society Listserv

Metaphysics
Philosophical societies in the United States
Member organizations of the American Council of Learned Societies
1950 establishments in the United States
Organizations established in 1950
Continental philosophy organizations